Girolamo Riario (1443 – 14 April 1488) was Lord of Imola (from 1473) and Forlì (from 1480). He served as Captain General of the Church under his uncle Pope Sixtus IV. He was one of the organisers of the failed 1478 Pazzi conspiracy against the Medici family, the rulers of Florence, and was assassinated 10 years later by members of the Forlivese Orsi family.

Biography 

Born in Savona, Riario was the son of Paolo Riario and Bianca della Rovere. He was a nephew of Pope Sixtus IV, who in 1473 granted him the seignory of Imola, as a dowry for his marriage with Caterina Sforza (daughter of Galeazzo Maria Sforza, Duke of Milan). In 1471, he was also appointed Captain General of the Church.

In 1478, he was one of the plotters behind the Pazzi conspiracy, a plan to assassinate the two most prominent members of the Medici family in Florence. In addition to conspiring, he was an intended beneficiary, once Lorenzo and Giuliano de' Medici had been killed. Riario would have become Lord of Florence. But the plot failed, as only Giuliano was killed.

Count of Forlì

In 1480 the pope made Girolamo Riario Count of Forlì, confiscating the lordship from the Ordelaffi. At Forlì, Riario erected the fortress of Rocca di Ravaldino, one of the strategically most important strongholds of the Romagna. He also rebuilt much of the town of Imola, tearing down old and decayed houses.

During his uncle's pontificate, Riario mostly resided with his wife in Rome. In 1484, he started a conflict with the Colonna family, whose landed property Sixtus IV wished to take over. In the course of this feud he had the papal protonotary, Lorenzo Colonna, arrested and tortured to death, a deed which provoked much enmity against his family in the city.

After the death of Pope Sixtus IV, Riario, as commander of the papal forces, returned to Rome with his wife Caterina. She entered the Castel Sant' Angelo with troops in order to put pressure on the cardinals to elect a candidate conformable to the Riarios' interests. After 10 days of chaos in Rome, Riario concluded with the terrified cardinals that he would withdraw his troops and his wife's occupation of the castello in return for 7,000 ducats in cash. Caterina first did not follow this scheme, but after two days had to give in to what her husband had negotiated; only then the conclave could start.

Death
Riario promoted several further plots against the Medici, but they all failed. In 1488, he was the last of the main Pazzi conspirators left alive, and was himself assassinated in a conspiracy led by two members of the Orsi family from Forlì, supposedly over a financial dispute. On 14 April, Checco and Ludovico Orsi entered the government palace, and one of them attacked Riario with a sword. Despite the presence of the Count's guards, a total of nine assassins slashed Riario to death, eventually flinging his corpse into a local piazza, where a crowd gathered in support of the assassins. The assassins then proceeded to loot the palace.

Although assassinations were not altogether uncommon in Renaissance Florence, they still had repercussions. Despite writing to Lorenzo de' Medici, who no doubt approved of the result of the assassination, they received no written support by the Medici family. Support, both military and popular, eventually sided with Riario's widow, and the Orsi brothers fled, taking what they could with them. Their remaining assets and family were soon destroyed by angry mobs.

Riario's body had been recovered from the piazza by a local friar, and once Riario's widow proved vindicated, she had the body cleaned up and laid in state for three days in the church of San Francesco.

Family
In 1473, Riario became betrothed to the 10-year-old Caterina Sforza. They had five sons, Ottaviano (who officially inherited the lordship of Imola), Cesare, Giovanni Livio, Galeazzo, and Francesco, and a daughter, Bianca. He also had an illegitimate son named Scipio by another woman.

In popular culture
 Riario is mentioned in the 2009 video game Assassin's Creed II as one of the Pazzi conspirators and a member of the Templar Order. After discovering her husband's affiliations, Caterina Sforza hires the Orsi brothers to kill him, thought they later turn on her and lead their troops in an attack on Forlì.
 In W. Somerset Maugham's 1898 novel The Making of a Saint, the events surrounding Girolamo and Caterina in Forlì are described through the eyes of a political opponent.
 Riario is the main antagonist in the historical fiction TV series Da Vinci's Demons, where he is portrayed  by Blake Ritson.
 Riario is also the principal antagonist in Martin Woodhouse's Medici trilogy, a historical romance revolving around Leonardo da Vinci's military exploits for the Medici.
 Riario is the principal antagonist in the third season of the Netflix series Medici, played by Jack Roth. In the show, he is assassinated in Rome immediately after the papal election, having been betrayed by Catarina.

Citations

References 

 
 

1443 births
1488 deaths
Lords of Forlì
People from Savona
Assassinated Italian people
Lords of Imola
15th-century Italian nobility
Captains General of the Church